Kurt Henkels (December 17, 1910, Solingen - July 12, 1986, Hamburg) was a German bandleader who led jazz and light music ensembles. He led radio and television dance bands from the 1930s into the 1970s and made over 250 recordings.

German jazz bandleaders
German conductors (music)
German male conductors (music)
1910 births
1986 deaths
German male jazz musicians
Musicians from Hamburg
20th-century male musicians